John Hales Whitney Sr. (April 8, 1917September 22, 1995) was an American animator, composer and inventor, widely considered to be one of the fathers of computer animation.

fa:test

Life

Whitney was born in Pasadena, California and attended Pomona College. He is a descendant of the Whitney family through his father's direct line. His first works in film were 8 mm movies of a lunar eclipse which he made using a home-made telescope. In 1937-38 he spent a year in Paris, studying twelve-tone composition under René Leibowitz. In 1939 he returned to America and began to collaborate with his brother James on a series of abstract films. Their work, Five Film Exercises (1940–45) was awarded a prize for sound at the First International Experimental Film Competition in Belgium in 1949. In 1948 he was awarded a Guggenheim Fellowship.

During the 1950s, Whitney used his mechanical animation techniques to create sequences for television programs and commercials. In 1952, he directed engineering films on guided missile projects. One of his most famous works from this period were the animated title and dream sequences from Alfred Hitchcock's 1958 film Vertigo, which he collaborated on with the graphic designer Saul Bass.

In 1960, he founded Motion Graphics Incorporated, which used the mechanical analog computer of his own invention to create motion picture and television title sequences and commercials. The following year, he assembled a record of the visual effects he had perfected using his device, titled simply Catalog. In 1966, IBM awarded John Whitney, Sr. its first artist-in-residence position.

By the 1970s, Whitney had abandoned his analog computer in favor of faster, digital processes. He taught the first computer graphics class at UCLA in 1972. The pinnacle of his digital films is his 1975 work Arabesque, characterized by psychedelic, blooming color-forms. In 1969–70, he experimented with motion graphics computer programming at California Institute of Technology. His work during the 1980s and 1990s benefited from faster computers and his invention of an audio-visual composition program called the Whitney-Reed RDTD (Radius-Differential Theta Differential). Works from this period, such as Moondrum (1989–1995), used self-composed music and often explored mystical or Native-American themes.

All of John Whitney's sons (Michael, Mark and John Jr.) are also film-makers.

Several of the films (plus some of James Whitney's), were preserved by Center for Visual Music, Los Angeles. HD transfers from their preservation have been seen in major museum exhibitions including Visual Music at Museum of Contemporary Art, Los Angeles and The Hirshhorn Museum (2005), Sons et Lumieres at Centre Pompidou (2004–05), The Third Mind at The Guggenheim Museum, and other shows.

Whitney's mechanical analog computer
The analog computer Whitney used to create his most famous animations was built in the late 1950s by converting the mechanism of a World War II M-5 antiaircraft gun director. Later, Whitney would augment the mechanism with an M-7 mechanism, creating a twelve-foot-high machine. Design templates were placed on three different layers of rotating tables and photographed by multiple-axis rotating cameras. The color was added during optical printing. Whitney's son, John, Jr., described the mechanism in 1970:

Archive
The Academy Film Archive houses the Whitney Collection and has preserved over a dozen films from the collection. The collection encompasses the work of John and James Whitney, as well as John's sons Mark, John, and Michael.

See also
Spirograph – A drawing toy with a resemblance to some of Whitney's art.
History of computer animation

Audio/video

Coverpop.com

Further reading
 Manovich, Lev (2001). The Language of New Media Cambridge. MIT Press.
 Whitney, John (1980). Digital Harmony: On the Complementarity of Music and Visual Art. Peterborough, N.H. Byte Books/McGraw-Hill.
 Youngblood, Gene (1970). Expanded Cinema Clarke, Irwin & Company

References

External links

The John Whitney Biographical Site at SIGGRAPH, now held at the Internet Archive
Computational Periodics (essay by Whitney in Artist and Computer, 1976)
 Digital Harmony, article by William Moritz

1917 births
1995 deaths
20th-century composers
American animated film directors
American animators
American composers
Artists from Pasadena, California
Visual music artists
American experimental filmmakers
Pomona College alumni
20th-century American inventors